Agnieszka Jochymek (born 10 September 1985) is a Polish handball player.

Career
Jochymek played for the club MKS Zagłębie Lubin. Playing for Polish national team, she represented Poland at the 2013 World Women's Handball Championship in Serbia.

Personal life
Jochymek was born in Krapkowice on 10 September 1985.

References

External links
Player profile at the Polish Handball Association website 
 

Polish female handball players
1985 births
Living people
People from Krapkowice
Sportspeople from Opole Voivodeship
20th-century Polish women
21st-century Polish women